Andrzej Kobyliński (5 December 1931 – 4 April 1990) was a Polish equestrian. He competed in two events at the 1960 Summer Olympics.

References

External links
 

1931 births
1990 deaths
Polish male equestrians
Olympic equestrians of Poland
Equestrians at the 1960 Summer Olympics
People from Nowy Tomyśl County